This is a list of coal mines in the United Kingdom, sorted by those that were operating in the 2010s or after and those closed before this decade.

The last operating deep coal mine in the United Kingdom, Kellingley colliery in North Yorkshire, closed in December 2015. Most continuing coal mines are collieries owned by freeminers, or are open pit mines of which there were 26 in 2014.

Modern coal mines
List of coal mines closed in the 2010s, 2020s or currently in operation.

 For the year given.

Historic mines
List of coal mines closed before the 2010s.

Ww With given year of peak.

See also
List of collieries in Yorkshire (1984–2015)
Coal mining in the United Kingdom

References

External links
 List of Northern English Coal Mines at the Durham Mining Museum.

 
United Kingdom